Beach Avenue may refer to:

 An American band with Nick Fradiani as the lead singer
 A major thoroughfare in Cape May, New Jersey